Guinea was a 38-gun fourth rate vessel of the Kingdom of England, Her initial commission was as a Royalist vessel during the English Civil War named Charles. She was captured then commissioned into the Parliamentary Naval Force as Guinea. During the First Anglo-Dutch War she partook in the Battle of Kentish Knock, the Battle of Portland and the Battle of The Gabbard. During the Second Anglo-Dutch War she participated in the Battle of Lowestoft, the Battle of Vagen and the St James Day Fight. She was sold on 27 November 1667.

Guinea was the only named vessel in the English or Royal Navy.

Charles was the fourth named vessel since it was used for a 16-gun pinnace, built at Woolwich and sold in 1616.

Specifications
She was purchased by the Royalists in 1648, then captured by the Parliamentarians in 1649. Her builder's measure tonnage was calculated as  tons.

Her gun armament in 1648 was 38 guns. When captured she was equipped with 30 guns then increased to 34 guns by 1653. In 1666 her armament was 38 (wartime)/32 (peacetime) and consisted of ten culverins, ten demi-culverines, eighteen sakers. Her manning was 140 personnel and rose to 150/120/100 personnel.

Commissioned Service

Service in the English Civil War and Commonwealth Navy
She was commissioned as Charles into Royalist Navy under Captain Thomas Allin in 1648 to serve with Prince Rupert's squadron at Kinsale, Ireland. She was captured in Irish Waters on 25 April 1649 by Constant Warwick and Leopard. On 4 May 1649 she was ordered to be taken into the Parliamentary Naval Force. She was commissioned as Guinea into the Parliamentary Navy in 1649 under the command of Captain Thomas Thorowgood for the blockade of Kinsale. In 1650 she was under Captain Walter Wood for service on the Irish coast. She sailed with Penn's squadron to the Azores on 30 November 1650 then she went on to the Mediterranean. She was involved in the Scilly operations in 1651. Later in 1651 under the command of Captain Edmund Curtis she sailed to Virginia.

First Anglo-Dutch War
During the First Anglo-Dutch War she partook in the Battle of Kentish Knock as a member of Robert Blake's Fleet on 28 September 1652. She followed that with the Battle of Portland on 18 February 1653. As a member of Red Squadron, Rear Division she took part in the Battle of the Gabbard on 2–3 June 1653. On 31 July 1653 she participated in the Battle of Scheveningen off Texel as a member Red Squadron, Rear Division. She spent the winter of 1653/54 under the command of Captain George Acklam at Portsmouth.

In 1654 she came under the command of Jonathan Barnes followed by Captain Giles Shelley in 1656 for service with Robert Blakes Fleet until July 1656 then spent time in the English Channel. Captain Jeffrey Pearce was her commander in 1658. She was repaired at Portsmouth under the guidance of Master Shipwright John Tippetts for £646 between September 1659 and April 1660.

Service after the Restoration May 1660
Captain Hugh Hide was in command from 26 February 1664 to 30 January 1665. Captain Andrew Ashford took over the next day on 31 January and held command until 26 February 1665.

Second Anglo-Dutch War
On 19 May 1665 Captain James Ableson took command. She was at the Battle of Lowestoft as a member of Red Squadron, Van Division on 3 June 1665. Captain Ableson was killed during the battle. On 11 June 1665 Captain Joseph Sanders took command. She was at the Battle of Vagen (at Bergen, Norway) on 3 August 1665. On 8 August 1665 she was under the command of Captain Thomas Roome Coyle. She was in action during 3/4 September 1665. Captain William Coleman relieved Captain Coyle on 2 June 1666 and he in turn was relieved of command on 12 June 1666 by Captain Arthur Ashby. She was at the Battle of Orfordness as a member of White Squadron, Van Division on 25 July 1666 where Ashby was mortally wounded, dying on 15 August.

On 16 August 1666 she was under Captain Sir John Berry for an expedition to Lisbon. Captain William Davis took command on 2 November 1666 and died 21 November 1666. She was paid off in November 1667.

Disposition
Guinea was sold on 27 November 1667.

Notes

Citations

References

 British Warships in the Age of Sail (1603 – 1714), by Rif Winfield, published by Seaforth Publishing, England © Rif Winfield 2009, EPUB :
 Fleet Actions, 1.3 Battle of Kentish Knock
 Fleet Actions, 1.5 Battle off Portland (the Three Days' Battle)
 Fleet Actions, 1.6 Battle of the Gabbard
 Fleet Actions, 1.8 Battle of Scheveningen (off Texel)
 Fleet Actions, 3.1 Battle of Lowestoft
 Fleet Actions, 3.2 Battle of Vagen (Bergen, Norway)
 Fleet Actions, 3.4 Battle of Orfordness (the St James Day Battle)
 Chapter 4 Fourth Rates - 'Small Ships', Vessels acquired from 25 March 1603, Ex-Royalist Prizes (1649-52), Guinea
 Ships of the Royal Navy, by J.J. Colledge, revised and updated by Lt-Cdr Ben Warlow and Steve Bush, published by Seaforth Publishing, Barnsley, Great Britain, © the estate of J.J. Colledge, Ben Warlow and Steve Bush 2020, EPUB , Section C (Charles), Section G (Guinea)
 The Arming and Fitting of English Ships of War 1800 - 1815, by Brian Lavery, published by US Naval Institute Press © Brian Lavery 1989, Part V Guns, Type of Guns

Ships of the line of the Royal Navy
1640s ships
Ships of the English navy